Paul Eiding (born March 28, 1957) is an American actor and instructor, best known for his voice roles as Colonel Roy Campbell in the Metal Gear series and Max Tennyson in the Ben 10 franchise.

Early career
Eiding was inspired to become an actor by his experience serving in the United States Army's 3rd Infantry Division in Würzburg, Germany. During this time, he joined a performing group named the Marne Glee Club. Although he was one of the youngest G.I.s in the group, he was soon promoted to a directing position due to his music background. The group performed across Germany, Belgium, Denmark, and northern France for soldiers and civilian audiences.

During the 1970s, Eiding was a prolific commercial actor, appearing in advertisements for snowmobiles, granola bars, department stores, and clothing. He also worked for theater groups across the Midwest, including Dudley Riggs's Brave New Workshop in Minneapolis. Eiding found the Brave New Workshop's improvisational approach exhausting, elaborating that "You have to take time off to think of new ideas. At Dudley Riggs we were doing nine shows a week". Before coming to Wausau, Wisconsin, Eiding played a small part aside Sylvester Stallone in the Norman Jewison film F.I.S.T., which was shot in Iowa. In Wausau, he led a number of workshops, and was a guest director for its community theater's production of the comedy-mystery What the Butler Saw in 1980. He was a director and actor for the Chanhassen Dinner Theater of Minneapolis, portraying Max Detweiler in its 1981 production of The Sound of Music. On February 2, 1981, Eiding hosted the Twin Cities' first award ceremony for distinguished achievement in local theater, which was held at the Children's Theatre Company.

In 1983, Eiding starred in a dual role as Joshua and Cathy in Don Amendolia's Los Angeles production of Caryl Churchill's Cloud 9. In the late 1980s, Eiding appeared in the short-lived ABC sitcom The Charmings as the neighbor Don Miller.

Filmography

Film
 F.I.S.T. (1978)
 The Personals (1982) as David
 Madhouse (1990) as Stark
 American Zombie (2007) as Hank Baker
 The Submarine Kid (2015) as Thunder Lake Mayor

Radio
 Adventures in Odyssey – Michael Horden
 Adam's Rib (radio adaptation)
 American Appetites (radio adaptation)
 Dinah Was (radio adaptation)

Animation
 Amphibia – Monroe, additional voices
 Avatar: The Last Airbender – Additional voices
 A Pup Named Scooby-Doo – Mr. Forester / The Ice Demon
 Ben 10 – Max Tennyson, Old Max Tennyson, Upgrade Max, Baddie #1, Chicken Soldier, Thug, Announcer, Radio  Chatter #2, Fiery Buddy, Seasoned Pro, TV Announcer, Security Guard #2, Camper
 Ben 10: Alien Force – Max Tennyson, DNAliens, Ishyama, Highbreed Soldier, New Alien, Chair Alien, Mouldywarp, Lukik, Alien Serf, Moe, Truck Driver
 Ben 10: Ultimate Alien – Max Tennyson, Guard #1, Guard #2, Colonel
 Ben 10: Omniverse – Max Tennyson, Max Tennyson (future), Liam, Blukic, Blukic (future), Eye Guy, Zed, Hoodlum, Ultimate Spidermonkey, Prisoner, Highbreed Bailiff, additional voices
 Cow and Chicken – Additional voices
 Daisy-Head Mayzie – Mr. McGrew
 Evil Con Carne – Buster, Dad, Guy
 Fantastic Max – Max's Father, Arnold Fifelton
 Hound Town – Voices
 James Bond Jr. – Additional voices
 Jumanji – Additional voices
 The Jetsons – Additional voices
 The Littles – Additional voices
 Sky Commanders – Raider Rath
 The Smurfs – Additional voices
 The Grim Adventures of Billy & Mandy – Barney, janitor, man in car
 The Pirates of Dark Water – Additional voices
 The Real Adventures of Jonny Quest – Bennett
 SWAT Kats: The Radical Squadron – Dr. N. Zyme
 Toxic Crusaders – No-Zone
 The Transformers – Perceptor, additional voices
 W.I.T.C.H. – Jeek

Television appearances

Film

Video games

 Avatar: The Last Airbender - The Burning Earth - Ukano 
 Battlezone 2 – Padishah Frank Burns
 Cartoon Network Universe: FusionFall – Max Tennyson
 Condemned 2: Bloodshot – Deputy Director Ike Farrell / Malcolm Vanhorn
 Diablo III – Mayor Holus, Chancellor Eamon
 Doom 3 BFG Edition –  Dr. Richard Meyers
 Dragon Age: Origins – Additional Voices
 Escape from Monkey Island – Gunner Simkins, Mr. Quidworth
 Eve of Extinction – Z
 Guild Wars: Eye of the North – King Jalis Ironhammer
 Guild Wars 2 – Warmaster Forgal Kernsson
 Heroes of the Storm – Mephisto
 Jade Empire – Kang the Mad, Additional Voices
 James Cameron's Avatar: The Game – Karl Falco
 Lost: Via Domus – John Locke
 Marvel: Ultimate Alliance 2 – The President of the United States
 Mega Math Blaster – Narration
 Murdered: Soul Suspect – Additional Voices
 Rage – Redstone
 Rise of the Argonauts – Argos the Shipwright
 Sacrifice – Eldred
 Samurai Western – Goldberg
 Star Wars: The Old Republic – Additional Voices
 StarCraft II – the Overmind, Protoss Advisor
 Super Smash Bros. Brawl – Colonel Roy Campbell
 Super Smash Bros. Ultimate – Colonel Roy Campbell
 Syphon Filter: Dark Mirror – Gary Stoneman
 Syphon Filter: The Omega Strain  – Gary Stoneman
 Too Human – Bragi, Wolf Veteran, Barkeep 
 Warcraft III: The Frozen Throne – Gul'dan, Varimathras, Jailor Kassan

References

External links 

1957 births
20th-century American male actors
21st-century American male actors
American male film actors
American male radio actors
American male stage actors
American male television actors
American male video game actors
American male voice actors
Living people
Male actors from Cleveland
United States Army soldiers